William Reid (17 October 1867 – 19 December 1943) was an Australian cricketer. He played in one first-class match for South Australia in 1892/93.

See also
 List of South Australian representative cricketers

References

External links
 

1867 births
1943 deaths
Australian cricketers
South Australia cricketers
Cricketers from Adelaide